KF Vëllazërimi 77 is a football club based in Kičevo, North Macedonia. They are currently not playing in any of the four highest tiers of Macedonian football.

History
KF Vëllazërimi entered in the Macedonian First League in the 2005–2006 season and they were the sensation of the league after their great start. But, after some economic problems a lot of the players left the team, however Vëllazërimi managed to stay in the league. The 2006–2007 season found Vëllazërimi with new financial problems and they finished 12th (last) in the league getting  relegated. The relegation forced change at the top and the new club chairman was named Gani Arsllani. He sacked coach Nazmi Ajdini referring to the poor results shown in the past year, and named Igor Nikolaevski as the new coach. Since then KF Vëllazërimi never had the finance they had before, they were relegated to the Third Macedonian League. They played in the Third Macedonian League for many seasons till summer 2014 when they got in Macedonian Second League. Now for two seasons KF Vëllazërimi is getting upper slowly but surely. In 2014/2015 they managed to stay in the league and in this season they are strong to beat home and away, many think that KF Vëllazërimi will manage to stay in Second League.

Honours
 Macedonian Second League:
Winners (1): 2004–05

External links
Club info at MacedonianFootball 

Football clubs in North Macedonia
Association football clubs established in 1977
1977 establishments in the Socialist Republic of Macedonia
FK
Vëllazërimi 77